Equestrian competitions at the 2011 Pan American Games in Guadalajara, Mexico were held from October 16 to October 29 at the Guadalajara Country Club (dressage), Hipica Club (dressage/jumping) and Santa Sofia Golf Club (eventing). Each event was a qualify riders and horses for the 2012 Summer Olympics in London, Great Britain.

Medal summary
Key

Medal table

Events

Schedule
All times are Central Daylight Time (UTC-5).

Qualification

There was a maximum of 130 competitors, and each NOC was allowed to enter a maximum of four athletes in dressage and five athletes each in eventing.

See also
 Equestrian at the 2012 Summer Olympics

References

 
Events at the 2011 Pan American Games
2011
P
Equestrian sports competitions in Mexico